Sad But True is the 12th album by West London post punk and indie band The Times recorded in 1987 and  released in 1997.<ref name="Discogs.com">[http://www.discogs.com/Times-Sad-But-True/release/2191637 The Times on Discogs.com]</ref>

Track listingThe Ballad Of MeJust A SongChanging Of The GuardAlmost A ReligionObviously One More DisbelieverYour Ship Is Almost BuiltRiot HouseSee Ya Wouldn't Wanna Be YaTwo Hitlers In One BunkerComing From This Heart''

References

The Times (band) albums
1997 albums